People was the first commercial release by American rock band The Golden Republic. It was released as an EP in the US by Astralwerks on September 21, 2004 (see 2004 in music).

Track listing
All tracks written by The Golden Republic.
"You Almost Had It" – 2:51
"Great Communication" – 3:22
"Make It" – 4:32
"Row of People" – 4:20

2004 EPs
The Golden Republic albums
Astralwerks EPs